The Two Medicine Formation is a geological formation, or rock body, in northwestern Montana and southern Alberta that was deposited between  and  (million years ago), during Campanian (Late Cretaceous) time. Below the formation are the nearshore (beach and tidal zone) deposits of the Virgelle Sandstone, and above it is the marine Bearpaw Shale. Throughout the Campanian, the Two Medicine Formation was deposited between the western shoreline of the Late Cretaceous Interior Seaway and the eastward advancing margin of the Cordilleran Overthrust Belt. The Two Medicine Formation is mostly sandstone, deposited by rivers and deltas.

History of research 
In 1913, a US Geological Survey crew headed by Eugene Stebinger and a US National Museum crew headed by Charles Gilmore worked together to excavate the first dinosaur of the formation. Stebinger was the first to identify the Two Medicine Formation and formally described the first fossils in a scientific paper published in 1914. Gilmore returned to the Formation in 1928 and 1935. During this time frame only three species were named and of these only Styracosaurus ovatus and Edmontonia rugosidens are still regarded as valid. Barnum Brown prospected the formation in 1933, but found nothing significant. Both of their research were interrupted by World War II. In 1977, Trexler reports finding hadrosaur remains west of Choteau, Montana. During the next year baby hadrosaurs were discovered. In 1979, Horner and Makela referred these hadrosaur bones to Maiasaura peeblesorum. The announcement attracted renewed scientific interest to the formation and many new kinds of dinosaurs were discovered. More nesting sites were discovered later, including the Devil's Coulee site yielding Hypacrosaurus stebingeri in southern Alberta in 1987.

Geology 
The loosely consolidated fine grain sediments composing the formation allow for fast plant growth in badland areas, limiting the number of exposed outcrops. Paleosols, fluvial deposits and bentonitic layers are common in the Two Medicine Formation.

Age 
The Two Medicine Formation spans from 80 to 74 Ma, nearly the entire length of the Campanian stage. The deposition of the formation may be diachronous. The Lower Two Medicine dates to late Santonian to early Campanian times. The Upper Two Medicine dates to middle-late Campanian times.

Equivalents 
There are several equivalents to the Two Medicine Formation, as with many geologic formations (most of which are named after their type locality). The Sweetgrass Arch in Montana divides the Two Medicine from the Judith River Formation, Bearpaw Shale, Claggett Shale, and Eagle Sandstone. Across the Canada–US border, the Two Medicine Formation correlates to the Belly River Group in southwest Alberta, and the Pakowki Formation eastward.

Stratigraphy 
The Two Medicine overlies the Virgelle Sandstone, which formed from the beach sands exposed on northern and western shores of the receding Colorado Sea. A Cretaceous Interior Seaway transgression submerged the area briefly early on in Two Medicine history leaving anomalous paralic sediments and isolated shale bodies about 100 m above the base of the formation. The Middle portion of the two medicine formation is about 225 m thick, deposited while the Clagette Sea was receding and the Bearpaw Sea transgressing. This portion is stratigraphically equivalent to the Judith River Formation and Judith River Group. The sediments are mainly bentonitic siltstones and mudstones with "occasional sandstone lenses." These sediments are thought to be the remains of a coastal plain "far removed" from the interior sea. The upper portion is about one half of the formation. Its sediments are similar to the middle portions but punctuated by extensive red beds and caliche horizons.  The uppermost 80 m were deposited after the inundation of the Judith River equivalent sediments by the Bearpaw Sea. They are thought to have been deposited in only 500,000 years. Bentonitic ash is common in the Two Medicine. To the south extrusive volcanic activity occurred in association with the Boulder Batholith collectively called the Elkhorn Volcanics.

Taphonomy 
Most of the vertebrate fossils are preserved by CaCo3 permineralization. This type of preservation preserves high levels of detail, even down to the microscopic level. However, it also leaves specimens vulnerable to weathering when exposed to the surface.

Paleoenvironment

Climate 

The Two Medicine Formation was deposited in a seasonal, semi-arid climate with possible rainshadows from the Cordilleran highlands. This region during the Campanian experienced a long dry season and warm temperatures. Lithologies, invertebrate faunas, and plant and pollen data support the above interpretation. The extensive red beds and caliche horizons of the upper Two Medicine are evidence of at least seasonally arid conditions. Some of the dinosaurs from the formation have been speculated to have shown signs of drought-related death.

Elevation 
A more upland environment existed in the south of the Two Medicine Formation. Streams had a northeasterly flow away from these southwestern uplands. The southern part of the Two medicine formation grades into brackish water siltstone/sandstone series called the Horsethief Formation. The sediments of the Horsethief represent shallower water deposits than the Bearpaw Shale adding further evidence of higher elevation areas existing in the south.

Egg Mountain site 
Egg Mountain, which is near Choteau, Montana, was discovered in 1977 by Marion Brandvold, owner of the Trex Agate Rock Shop in Bynum, Montana, who discovered the bones of juvenile dinosaurs at this site. It is a colonial nesting site on the Willow Creek Anticline in the Two Medicine Formation that is famous for its fossil eggs of Maiasaura, which demonstrated for the first time that at least some dinosaurs cared for their young. The eggs were arranged in dug-out earthen nests, each nest about a parent's body length from the next, and baby dinosaurs were also found with skeletons too cartilaginous for them to walk - similar to those of altricial (helpless) baby birds.  The parent(s) must then have brought food to the young, and there is plant matter in the nests that may be evidence of either this or for incubation of the eggs. Maiasaura also grew extremely fast, at rates comparable to modern birds. Skeletons of Orodromeus and skeletons and eggs of Troodon were also found at Egg Mountain.

Biostratigraphy 

Most dinosaur-bearing rock formations do not contain multiple distinct faunas at different positions within the formation's stratigraphic column. Usually the lower sediments of a given formation will contain the same kinds of dinosaurs as the upper sediments, or the species composition changes only gradually. However, some researchers had argued that the Two Medicine Formation was an exception, preserving multiple distinct dinosaur faunas.

Later research came to find that the supposedly distinct dinosaur faunas at different levels of the formations were more similar than had been previously thought. While the dinosaur fauna of the lower and middle sections Two Medicine was apparently diverse, the quality of preservation was low and few of these remains can be referred to individual species. The middle Two Medicine is a better source of fossils, but still poor overall. This makes it difficult to argue that these sections of the formation preserve distinct faunas.

The upper portion of the formation is more diverse and preserves better quality fossils. However, many of the taxa that supposedly distinguished it as a separate fauna have since been found in older sediments. In particular, Gryposaurus latidens and Hypacrosaurus have been found to coexist with Maiasaura. Further, there are fossil teeth that seem to show the presence of certain taxa are unbroken throughout the whole formation.

Nevertheless, some true changes in faunal composition seem to occur in the upper Two Medicine. The appearance of Maiasaura in the formation precedes the arrival of a diverse variety of other ornithischians. According to David Trexler, thorough examination of strata found along the Two Medicine River (which exposes the entire upper half of the Two Medicine Formation) indicates that the apparent diversification was a real event rather than a result of preservational biases.

The timeline below follows the stratigraphic chart presented by Horner et al. 2001.

Dinosaurs 
Some of the dinosaurs from the formation have been speculated to show signs of drought related death. Very few articulated dinosaurs have been found in the formation; most specimens are isolated, bone bed, poorly preserved or broken remains. Early studies assumed that the Two Medicine Formation would have the same dinosaurs as the Judith River Formation. It was only in 1978, that it was discovered that the formation had endemic dinosaurs. Even some genera regarded as wide-ranging predators exhibited a species difference between the Two Medicine and other formations. No ecological barriers have been postulated apart from upland/lowland habitat preference differences between the Two Medicine and Judith River Formation. There is no unequivocal evidence for intermingling between the wildlife of the Two Medicine and geographically adjacent contemporary formations. Dinosaur remains are more common in the upper part of the Two Medicine.

Ankylosaurs

Avialans

Ceratopsians

Non-avialan eumaniraptorans

Ornithopods 
An unidentified lambeosaurine has been collected from the same stratigraphic placement, west of Bynum, and is in preparation at The Montana Dinosaur Center

Oviraptorosaurs 
The first find of an oviraptorosaur in Montana was an articular region from the lower jaw of Caenagnathus sternbergi, from the Two Medicine Formation, according to a 2001 paper by David J. Varrichio. This species had previously only been known from the Canadian province of Alberta. Varrichio observes that during the late Campanian, Alberta and Montana had very similar theropods despite significant differences in the types of herbivorous dinosaur faunas.

Tyrannosauroids

Other fauna 
Many other fossil animals have been found, such as freshwater bivalves, gastropods, turtles, lizards such as Magnuviator, and champsosaurs. The multituberculate mammal Cimexomys has been found on Egg Mountain. The species Piksi barbarulna was described based on forelimb bones from the Two Medicine Formation; it was initially thought to be a bird, but subsequently it was reinterpreted as a pterosaur, likely a member of Ornithocheiroidea. Insect and mammal burrows have also been discovered, as well as dinosaur coprolites.

See also 
 List of dinosaur-bearing rock formations
 List of fossil sites (with link directory)

References

Bibliography 
 Dodson, P., C.A. Forster, and S.D. Sampson. 2004. Ceratopsidae in Weishampel, D.B., P. Dodson, and H. Osmolska (eds.) The Dinosauria. 2nd Edition, University of California Press.
 
 Trexler, D., 2001, Two Medicine Formation, Montana: geology and fauna: In:  Mesozoic Vertebrate Life, edited by Tanke, D. H., and Carpenter, K., Indiana  University Press, pp. 298–309.
 
 Varricchio, D. J. 2001. Late Cretaceous oviraptorosaur (Theropoda) dinosaurs from Montana. pp. 42–57 in D. H. Tanke and K. Carpenter (eds.), Mesozoic Vertebrate Life. Indiana University Press, Indianapolis, Indiana
  

Geologic formations of Alberta
Geologic formations of Montana
Upper Cretaceous Series of North America
Cretaceous Alberta
Cretaceous Montana
Campanian Stage
Sandstone formations of Canada
Sandstone formations of the United States
Fluvial deposits
Deltaic deposits
Ichnofossiliferous formations
Ooliferous formations
Fossiliferous stratigraphic units of North America
Paleontology in Alberta
Paleontology in Montana
Glacier National Park (U.S.)